Stephen Raynes (born 4 September 1971) is a Scottish former footballer who played as a midfielder for Forfar and Livingston.

Career

Playing career
Raynes started his career at Hibernian and left Easter Road in 1993 having made 3 first team appearances.

After leaving Hibernian, Raynes ventured abroad and played in Hong Kong and Ireland with Hong Kong Rangers and Dundalk respectively.

He returned to Scotland in 1997 to sign for Livingston, making his debut in a 2–0 defeat to Hearts in the Scottish League Cup on 9 August 1997. He went on to make 32 league appearances for Livingston and scored twice.

Raynes was on the move again in 1998, and signed for Forfar.  He made 32 league appearances for Forfar before leaving in 1999.

After a successful trial period, Raynes signed for Brechin in 1999.  He remained at Glebe Park for 2 years and appeared in 51 games.

Now approaching the end of his career, he spent the 2001–2002 season at Cowdenbeath. He appeared 15 times for the team before retiring from professional football.

References

External links
Stephen Raynes on Soccerbase

1971 births
Living people
Scottish footballers
Scottish Football League players
Association football defenders
Livingston F.C. players
Hibernian F.C. players
Dundalk F.C. players
Hong Kong Rangers FC players
Forfar Athletic F.C. players
Brechin City F.C. players
Cowdenbeath F.C. players
Footballers from Edinburgh
Scottish expatriate footballers